Girnar ropeway is a ropeway on Mount Girnar in Junagadh district, Gujarat, India. First proposed in 1983, the construction started only in September 2018 due to government approval delays and litigation. The construction and operation is managed by Usha Breco Limited. It was inaugurated on 24 October 2020.

History
Mount Girnar is a major pilgrim site because of presence of the Ambika temple, the Dattatreya shrine, and many Hindu temples as well as several Jain temples.

The Government of India also permitted in 1995.

The project was delayed when the palanquin-bearers, who carried pilgrims up the mount, opposed the project and petitioned the Gujarat High Court regarding their livelihood. The petition was dismissed after the company constructing the ropeway, Usha Breco Limited, agreed for compensatory livelihood. As of 2020, total 104 shops for palanquin-bearers who were affected by the project, are being constructed in the parking lot of the lower terminal. After objections from the environmental activists, the construction was further stopped in 1999.

The work resumed in 2002 after sorting the objections and the land was acquired in 2007. Then state Chief Minister Narendra Modi laid the foundation stone. As the project was located within the Girnar Wildlife Sanctuary and National Park, the wildlife clearance was granted by the National Board for Wildlife in 2011 while the environmental clearance was granted by the Ministry of Environment, Forest and Climate Change of India in 2016.

The proposed alignment of the ropeway was considered a risk to local endangered long-billed vultures. A Public Interest Litigation regarding it was filed in 2017 and was dismissed by the Gujarat High Court in 2020.

The construction was restarted in September 2018. The project was projected to open in May 2020 but was further delayed due to COVID-19 pandemic. Trial runs were carried out in September 2020 and the construction was completed on 17 October 2020. The project was inaugurated on 24 October 2020 by now Prime Minister Narendra Modi.

Technical features 
It operates mono-cable gondola detachable type lifts. It has 25 trolleys with capacity of eight passengers each. It can carry 1000 passengers per hour but operates at capacity of 800 passengers per hour and 8000 per day. The trip takes 7.43 minutes.

See also
 Aerial lift in India
 Pavagadh ropeway
 Ambaji ropeway
 Saputara ropeway

References

2020 establishments in Gujarat
Transport in Gujarat
Aerial tramways in India
Buildings and structures in Gujarat
Junagadh
Transport infrastructure completed in 2020